Heritage Toronto is an agency of the Municipal Government of Toronto that works to builds a better city by bringing people together to explore Toronto’s shared past and peoples’ lived experiences. It is located in St. Lawrence Hall in the city.

Its programs include tours, historical plaques, the State of Heritage Report, and online exhibits.

Programming 

Heritage Toronto's programming includes Tours, the Heritage Toronto Awards, Plaques, and special projects.

Tours 
From April/May to October, Heritage Toronto offers walking, bicycle and bus tours around the city as well as private tours for smaller groups . Tours are researched, designed and led by local historians, community groups and professionals who volunteer their time.

Heritage Toronto Awards 
Every October, Heritage Toronto hosts an evening of awards. Different award categories recognize the best in new books, architecture and craftsmanship, public history, and community heritage volunteer efforts. The Heritage Toronto Awards have been presented for over 45 years.

In 1996, the Kilbourn Lecture (known at the time as the William Kilbourn Memorial Lecture) was added to the Awards evening. It is named for William Kilbourn, The last lecture was offered in 2016.

Historical Plaques 
For over 50 years,  the Plaques Program has been recognizing people, places and events which have been influential to the city of Toronto. There are multiple kinds of plaques located around Toronto that represent different aspects of the city's history.

 Bronze Inventory Plaques recognize properties listed or designated under the City of Toronto's Inventory of Heritage Properties. These plaques interpret Toronto's built heritage.
 Commemorative Plaques describe people and events in Toronto's history, .
 In 2009, Heritage Toronto and the Toronto Legacy Project inaugurated a line of historical plaques modeled on the "Blue Plaques" of London, England. These plaques recognize notable Toronto residents by indicating where they lived or worked.

Special projects 

Sounds Like Toronto: The largest digital project by Heritage Toronto, this online exhibit launched in 2021. The digital experience, Sounds Like Toronto, presents 35 stories featuring artists and venues that epitomize Toronto’s music history, and combines exclusive audio and video interviews, 3D objects, interactive tours, and much more to impart both a better understanding of our shared music heritage and the broader social issues that have defined Canadian cultural history.

State of Heritage Report: Released every four years to coincide with Toronto municipal elections, the State of Heritage Report provides a picture of the current state of heritage in Toronto, lays out goals for strengthening the heritage sector and provides recommendations to the Mayor, City Council, senior staff and decision makers to improve heritage management. Prior to the release of the State of Heritage Report, Heritage Toronto hosts the Heritage Matters Mayoral Candidates Debate.

References

https://www.heritagetoronto.org/
http://torontoplaques.com/
http://urbantoronto.ca/news/2014/04/heritage-toronto-kicks-its-20th-season-tours
http://pubhist.info.yorku.ca/institution/heritage-toronto/

Municipal government of Toronto
Organizations based in Toronto
Historic preservation organizations in Canada
Culture of Toronto
History of Toronto